Joesoef Isak (15 July 1928 – 15 August 2009) was an Indonesian publisher, translator, and left-wing intellectual. He was an advocate of free speech during President Suharto's authoritarian New Order administration, and was imprisoned from 1967 to 1977 without trial. In 1980, he helped found and direct the publishing house Hasta Mitra, publisher of Pramoedya A. Toer's Buru quartet.

Biography
Isak was born in Petojo, Jakarta, on 15 July 1928. His father was a post-office employee who came from the Minangkabau region of West Sumatra.

Educated in the Dutch colonial system, Isak did not speak Indonesian as a young man.

In 2005, Isak was the inaugural recipient of the Australian PEN Keneally Award for his work.

Isak died on 15 August 2009 at the age of 81. He is buried at Jeruk Purut Cemetery in South Jakarta.

Notes

References
Max Lane, "On Joesoef Isak" 
"Joesoef Isak: A Life of Struggle," Green Left Weekly.

1928 births
2009 deaths
Free speech activists
Indonesian activists
Indonesian journalists
Indonesian prisoners and detainees
Minangkabau people
People from Batavia, Dutch East Indies
People from Jakarta
20th-century journalists